The McAllister Hills are a hill group or bastion between Shapeless Mountain and Wright Upper Glacier in Victoria Land, Antarctica. They were named by the Advisory Committee on Antarctic Names in 2004 after Major George R. McAllister of the 109th Airlift Wing, New York Air National Guard, an LC-130 command pilot in a pre-season McMurdo Station to South Pole Station flight on October 16, 1999.

References

Hills of Victoria Land
McMurdo Dry Valleys